The geology of Sint Eustatius represents a young Pleistocene volcanic island. The oldest rocks are overlain by the Sugar Loaf-White Wall Formation shallow marine limestone. The Quill is the island's highest point and although partially eroded records a pyroclastic volcano with a two kilometer wide crater.

References

Geography of Sint Eustatius
Natural history of Sint Eustatius
Sint Eustatius
Sint Eustatius
Volcanism of North America
Pleistocene volcanoes